Horderns Beach is located in Bundeena, New South Wales. Beach is 580 meters long.

References

Geography of Sydney
Beaches of New South Wales